The Buffalo Bandits are a lacrosse team based in Buffalo, New York playing in the National Lacrosse League (NLL). The 2023 season is their 31st season in the NLL.

Regular season

NLL Standings

Game log

Roster

Entry Draft
The 2021 NLL Entry Draft took place on August 28, 2021. The Bandits made the following selections:

References

Buffalo
Buffalo Bandits seasons
Buffalo Bandits